Cờ Đỏ is a rural district of Cần Thơ in the Mekong Delta region of Vietnam. As of 2003 the district had a population of 158,467. The district covers an area of 403 km2. The district capital lies at Thới Lai.

The district borders Vĩnh Thạnh district to the west, Kiên Giang province to the southwest and Thốt Nốt district to the north.

The district is notable for being an important headquarters of agricultural research into rice production in the region and contains the office of top scientists.

The district was established under Decree No. 05/2004/ND-CP on January 2, 2004.

Administrative divisions
The district is divided into one urban municipality, Cờ Đỏ, and 9 communes: Thới Hưng, Đông Hiệp, Đông Thắng, Thới Đông, Thới Xuân, Trung Hưng, Thạnh Phú, Cần Thơ, Trung An and Trung Thạnh.

References

External links 
Pictures of Cờ Đỏ Farm

Districts of Cần Thơ